Allomyces neomoniliformis is a species of fungus from Japan.

External links 

 Mycobank entry

References

Blastocladiomycota
Fungi described in 1940
Fungi of Japan